Bason Bridge railway station was a station on the Highbridge branch of the Somerset and Dorset Joint Railway, serving the village of East Huntspill.

Opened by the Somerset Central Railway in 1856, the station consisted of a wooden platform and buildings. A level crossing, goods yard and dedicated siding for milk train to the Wiltshire United Co-operative Society's creamery, were operated from two lever frames, one at each end of the station.

The station closed with the SDJR on 7 March 1966, although access to the dairy was maintained via a spur from Highbridge. In the months before closure, goods trains loaded with fly ash tipped at the construction site of the M5 motorway to enable it to progress across the Somerset Levels. Progress on construction of the motorway finally closed the spur line on 3 October 1972. The station site was later cleared, but the station house survived as a private house.

The roof of the station house caught fire on the 10th of April 2020 and the property was subsequently demolished.

References

External links
https://web.archive.org/web/20070518103011/http://www.sdjr.net/locations/bason_bridge.html
 Station on navigable O.S. map

Disused railway stations in Somerset
Former Somerset and Dorset Joint Railway stations
Railway stations in Great Britain opened in 1856
Railway stations in Great Britain closed in 1966
Beeching closures in England